Naval Hospital Boston Historic District is a historic district at the south end of Broadway in Chelsea, Massachusetts. The district encompasses the area around the former Chelsea Naval Hospital. It consists of five buildings, historically the original 1836 Naval hospital, the 1857 Marine hospital, the Commanding Officer's quarters, and two ordnance buildings.

The district was added to the National Register of Historic Places in 1973.

1836 Naval hospital
The original hospital was built of granite and was used as personnel quarters after a new hospital was built in 1915; it has been converted into condominiums.

1857 Marine hospital
The Marine hospital was a three-storey building built of brick with an "I"-shaped footprint; a fourth storey was added in 1866. The building was returned to the Navy in 1940. It has been converted into condominiums.

Commanding Officer's quarters
Parts of the Commanding Officer's quarters date back to 1856.

Ordnance buildings

Two buildings on the site were built in the early 19th century to handle ordnance for the United States Navy. The buildings were built by the Bureau of Ordnance and the land was transferred back to the hospital in 1910.

The larger building was designed to securely store explosives and ordnance and was not intended for human occupancy. It was a building within a building - an 1830s structure, without its original roof, encased within an 1860s structure which added the current exterior walls and a new roof.  The architect and engineer Alexander Parris designed the inside structure.  The floor is concrete and the interior is raw masonry, unpainted and unfinished.  The ceilings are made of brick and include vaults which were designed to contain fire and force explosions upward rather than outward.

The smaller building was used for quarters after being returned to the hospital, then as storage space.

See also
National Register of Historic Places listings in Suffolk County, Massachusetts

References

Historic districts in Suffolk County, Massachusetts
National Register of Historic Places in Chelsea, Massachusetts
Historic districts on the National Register of Historic Places in Massachusetts